Logan is a city in and county seat of Hocking County. The population was 7,152 at the time of the 2010 census.Logan is located in southeast Ohio, on the Hocking River 48 miles southeast of Columbus. The current mayor of Logan is Republican Greg Fraunfelter, who began a four-year term in January 2016 and was re-elected in 2019.

History 
Residents named the town in honor of Chief Logan of the Mingo Indian tribe. He and his band lived in this area at the time of European-American settlement. Ohio Governor Thomas Worthington established the community in 1816.

Logan was incorporated as a city in 1839.

Logan was the first city in the state of Ohio to install a double roundabout. Located at the interchange of Ohio State Route 664 and U.S. Route 33, the roundabouts were officially opened to traffic on December 4, 2013.

Geography

Demographics

2010 census
As of the census of 2010, there were 7,152 people, 2,982 households, and 1,831 families residing in the city. The racial makeup of the city was 97.5% White, 0.8% African American, 0.3% Native American, 0.2% Asian, 0.3% from other races, and 0.9% from two or more races. Hispanic or Latino of any race were 0.8% of the population.

There were 2,982 households, of which 31.3% had children under the age of 18 living with them, 41.4% were married couples living together, 15.1% had a female householder with no husband present, 4.9% had a male householder with no wife present, and 38.6% were non-families. 33.5% of all households were made up of individuals, and 15.1% had someone living alone who was 65 years of age or older. The average household size was 2.34 and the average family size was 2.95.

The median age in the city was 38 years. 24.3% of residents were under the age of 18; 9.1% were between the ages of 18 and 24; 24.6% were from 25 to 44; 24.5% were from 45 to 64; and 17.5% were 65 years of age or older. The gender makeup of the city was 46.4% male and 53.6% female.

2000 census
As of the census of 2000, there were 6,704 people, 2,790 households, and 1,768 families residing in the city. The racial makeup of the city was 97.87% White, 0.57% African American, 0.39% Native American, 0.06% Asian, 0.01% from other races, and 1.10% from two or more races. Hispanic or Latino of any race were 0.46% of the population.

There were 2,790 households, out of which 30.3% had children under the age of 18 living with them, 46.2% were married couples living together, 13.2% had a female householder with no husband present, and 36.6% were non-families. 32.4% of all households were made up of individuals, and 16.5% had someone living alone who was 65 years of age or older. The average household size was 2.33 and the average family size was 2.94.

In the city, the population was spread out, with 24.4% under the age of 18, 9.6% from 18 to 24, 24.9% from 25 to 44, 21.8% from 45 to 64, and 19.3% who were 65 years of age or older. The median age was 39 years. For every 100 females, there were 84.9 males. For every 100 females age 18 and over, there were 81.0 males.

The median income for a household in the city was $29,691, and the median income for a family was $38,143. Males had a median income of $31,875 versus $23,738 for females. The per capita income for the city was $15,836. About 13.0% of families and 17.7% of the population were below the poverty line, including 20.9% of those under age 18 and 16.8% of those age 65 or over.

Arts and culture
Every year, on the Thursday before Father's Day weekend, the downtown streets of Logan, Ohio come alive with the celebration of the washboard, as a musical instrument. Logan is the home of the Columbus Washboard Company, the only remaining washboard manufacturing company in the U.S. Washboards continue to be used as instruments of laundry today in some parts of the world and serve decoratively in many homes. The Washboard Music Festival celebrates the washboard's role as the source of "toe-tappin’" rhythm found in jug bands and Dixieland groups throughout the United States.

On the first Saturday of October, Logan High School hosts its annual marching band festival, the Logan Fall Festival of Bands. Bands who accept the invitation to perform at the festival entertain spectators with their halftime routines, some specially choreographed for the festival itself.

During the last week of July, the Insea Sound Shop of Nelsonville, Ohio, holds the annual Diamond Music Festival at the Isaac Walton Clubhouse, situated on the banks of Lake Logan.

Education
Logan-Hocking Schools operates five elementary schools, one middle school, and Logan High School. The Logan-Hocking County District Library, a public lending library, is located in Logan.

Notable people
 Estel Crabtree, MLB player for the Cincinnati Reds and St. Louis Cardinals
 Curtis Scaparrotti, Supreme Allied Commander Europe and commander of the United States European Command
 Katie Smith, WNBA player and Olympic gold medalist

Notable events 

 Murders of Annette Cooper and Todd Schultz

References

External links

  Hocking Hills Chamber of Commerce

Cities in Ohio
Cities in Hocking County, Ohio
County seats in Ohio
Populated places established in 1816
1816 establishments in Ohio